The Varscona Theatre is a live performance venue in the Old Strathcona neighborhood of Edmonton, Alberta, Canada. Since 1994, the Varscona has been operated by a consortium of small theatre companies, including Teatro la Quindicina and Shadow Theatre (collectively known as The Varscona Theatre Alliance). The theatre is also the home of the nationally renowned live improvised soap opera Die-Nasty.  In addition, the Varscona has hosted tapings of The Irrelevant Show, a national sketch comedy program aired on CBC Radio. The Varscona holds over 300 performances and has 30,000 audience members per year. It employs 100 local professional theatre artists.

History
The building was originally constructed as Edmonton's Fire Hall #6 in 1956, which replaced the original Fire Hall #6, built in 1909, across the street (the 1909 building has been home to The Walterdale Playhouse since 1974). Fire Station #6 was later relocated to 81 Avenue & 96 Street, and the building was repurposed as a theatre in 1982.

Prior to being renamed as The Varscona Theatre in 1996, the current building was called the Chinook Theatre, and served as the headquarters of Chinook Children's Theatre and the Edmonton International Fringe Festival from 1983-1993. It is still used as a venue during the Fringe Festival every August.

Name
The Varscona's name is an homage to Edmonton's original Varscona Theatre, a 1940s art deco movie theatre formerly located at the intersection of Whyte Avenue & 109 Street. The movie theatre was demolished in 1987 for the construction of a credit union (later a TD Canada Trust). The 1987 building was subsequently demolished and replaced, in 2009, by a Shoppers Drug Mart.

Renovations
In 2012, the theatre announced plans for a significant rehabilitation project. The plan would see the majority of the theatre demolished and rebuilt, with only the exterior brick walls and iconic tower remaining in the new structure. The project was to address the significant mechanical and utility failures that had developed in the building over the years, as well as expand the small lobby and backstage areas, which have plagued the building since its conversion from a fire hall. The theatre will also increase in capacity from 176 to 200 seats, with improved sight-lines, and the audio and lighting systems will be completely replaced.

In May 2013 the Government of Alberta announced a $2 million grant for renovation of the facility. The City of Edmonton and Government of Canada have also contributed funding to the $7.5 million project, with the remaining of funds coming from public donations. While the renovation project was underway, the Varscona Theatre Alliance built, and moved all performances into, The Backstage Theatre at the Fringe Theatre Adventures in the ATB Financial Arts Barns, one block away. The Varscona Theatre rebuild officially started construction in Spring of 2015, and opened its doors for its first production on June 2, 2016, with a new play from Teatro La Quindicina, For The Love of Cynthia by Stewart Lemoine.

References

External links 

 

Theatres in Edmonton